Grażyna Błąd (born 1 March 1969) is a Polish rowing coxswain. She competed in the women's coxed four event at the 1988 Summer Olympics.

References

External links
 

1969 births
Living people
Polish female rowers
Olympic rowers of Poland
Rowers at the 1988 Summer Olympics
People from Złotów
Sportspeople from Greater Poland Voivodeship
Coxswains (rowing)